Bockwurst is a German sausage traditionally made from ground veal and pork (tending more towards veal, unlike bratwurst). Bockwurst is flavored with salt, white pepper and paprika. Other herbs, such as marjoram, chives and parsley, are also often added and, in Germany, bockwurst is often smoked as well.

Bockwurst was originally said to have been eaten with bock beer. In Bavaria and Berlin it was sold during the bock beer season. Nowadays, it can be bought all year round almost everywhere in Germany in Butcher's shops, cheaper restaurants, snack bars, food booths, some bakeries and gas stations.

As a natural casing sausage it is usually cooked by simmering or steaming although it may also be grilled. Boiling is avoided as the casing may split open and the bockwurst may look unappetizing and loses flavor to the cooking water.

A usual portion consists of one bockwurst with mustard and a bread roll or potato salad on a plate. Sometimes, however, the bockwurst is served directly in the bread roll and covered with mustard. In some regions of Germany potato soup is served with bockwurst.

Bockwursts made in America, also from veal and pork, bear more resemblance to the Bavarian Weisswurst in color and taste, albeit parsley is rarely used in this version.

History
The "Bockwurst" was first mentioned in Bavaria in 1827. Nevertheless, an urban legend in Berlin claims that it was invented in 1889 by restaurant owner R. Scholtz of Berlin.

See also

 List of pork dishes
 List of sausages
 List of smoked foods
 List of veal dishes

References

Cooked sausages
German sausages
Veal dishes
Berlin cuisine
Smoked meat